Ray Bromley (23 September 1915 – 8 March 1988) was an  Australian rules footballer who played with North Melbourne in the Victorian Football League (VFL).

Notes

External links 
		

1915 births
1988 deaths
Australian rules footballers from Victoria (Australia)
North Melbourne Football Club players